Archaea is a domain of single-celled organisms.

Archaea or archea may also refer to:

 Archaea (spider), an extinct genus of Archaeidae
Archaea (journal), published by Hindawi

See also
Archean, or Archæan, a geological eon
 "archaeo-" ('ancient'), a commonly used taxonomic affixes